The Nordic Embassies in Berlin are the diplomatic missions of the Nordic countries to Germany, located in a common building complex, the Pan Nordic Building, in Berlin. The building complex was designed by the architects Alfred Berger and Tiina Parkkinen and completed in 1999.

The building comprises 6 individual buildings enveloped by a green, copper clad, snaking wall. Of the six buildings five are the embassies of Denmark, Iceland, Norway, Sweden and Finland, arranged geographically. The remaining building is a communal building called the Felleshus, which includes the entrance to the complex, an auditorium and a canteen.

Architects:
Complex and Felleshus (communal space) - Berger and Parkkinen
Denmark - 3XN
Iceland - PK Hönnun
Norway - Snøhetta
Sweden - Wingårdh Arkitektkontor
Finland - Viiva Arkkitehtuuri Oy

See also 
 List of diplomatic missions of the Nordic countries

References

External links

 Nordic Embassies
 Embassy of Denmark (in German or Danish)
 Embassy of Finland (in German, Finnish or Swedish)
 Embassy of Iceland (in German or English)
 Embassy of Norway (in German or Norwegian)
 Embassy of Sweden (in German, Swedish or English)
 Berger & Parkkinen page on the Embassy project
 Short film documenting the architecture of the Nordic Embassies

Nordic
Berlin
Berlin
Berlin
Berlin
Berlin
Buildings and structures completed in 1999
1999 establishments in Germany
Denmark–Germany relations
Finland–Germany relations
Germany–Iceland relations
Germany–Norway relations
Germany–Sweden relations